Donald E. Stephens (March 13, 1928 – April 18, 2007) was the first village president (mayor) of Rosemont, Illinois, US. He was also a leading Illinois Republican politician.

Stephens, born in Chicago, is believed to have been the longest-serving mayor in the United States at the time of his death. He was in the middle of serving his thirteenth consecutive four-year term as mayor of the suburban Cook County village; he almost exceeded the Illinois record for longest-serving mayor, set by Frank Caliper of Colp. He had served as mayor since its incorporation in 1956. Prior to that, he had been the president of the homeowner's association of the neighborhood that later became known as Rosemont. During his tenure, Rosemont grew from a tiny community of only 85 to one of Illinois' most politically important communities, with over 4,000 residents as well as the nation's tenth-largest convention center.  Stephens also oversaw the construction of the 18,500 seat Allstate Arena (formerly the Rosemont Horizon) and the Rosemont Theatre.

Controversy
Stephens' political career was dogged by accusations of association with organized crime, which led to the only major political defeat in his career: the revocation of a state-issued casino license for Rosemont. In 1983, Stephens was indicted, in separate prosecutions, for tax fraud and bribery, but was acquitted on both charges. Federal authorities investigated him multiple times throughout his career.

Death
Stephens died in Rosemont on April 18, 2007, of complications of stomach cancer. His son Brad succeeded him as mayor.

Personal life
Stephens was also an avid collector of Hummel figurines and established a museum holding his collection in Rosemont. The Donald E. Stephens Museum of Hummels claims to be the largest public display of Hummel figurines in the world.

References

External links
Donald E. Stephens Museum of Hummels

1928 births
2007 deaths
Mayors of places in Illinois
Politicians from Chicago
Deaths from stomach cancer
People from Rosemont, Illinois
Rosemont, Illinois
Deaths from cancer in Illinois
20th-century American politicians
Illinois Republicans